The Dublin, Wicklow and Wexford Railway (DW&WR) 2, built in 1885, was the predecessor to a total of eleven  locomotives to emerge from Grand Canal Street railway works between 1885 and 1896.  

Nos. 1, 6, 7 and 10, built between 1892 and 1896, had detail differences between them, Ahrons describes them as having a more modern appearance.

Locomotive No. 10 (St. Seneanus) was rebuilt as 2-4-2T in 1903. Nos. 28 (St. Lawrence), 45 (St. Kieran), and 46 (Princess Mary) were also rebuilt later in 1909/10.  

On review following amalgamation into Great Southern Railways (GSR) in 1925, Nos. 1, 2 and 6 were promptly withdrawn despite No. 2 having received a new boiler in 1914. The remaining four engines Nos. 7, 9, 47 and 49 were designated GSR class 423/G1 and allocated the numbers 426, 424, 425 and 423 respectively. Unlike the other survivors, No. 426 had not been re-boilered in 1914–1916 and it was withdrawn in 1926.

References

2-4-0T locomotives
5 ft 3 in gauge locomotives
Railway locomotives introduced in 1885
Scrapped locomotives
Steam locomotives of Ireland